Jefferson is a census-designated place (CDP) in Jefferson Parish, Louisiana, United States, on the north side (referred to as the "East Bank") of the Mississippi River. Jefferson is part of the New Orleans–Metairie–Kenner metropolitan statistical area. The population was 11,193 at the 2010 census, and 10,533 in 2020. It is often known by locals as "Old Jefferson" (to distinguish itself from the rest of Jefferson Parish), but should not be confused with Old Jefferson in East Baton Rouge Parish, Louisiana.

History

Early French colonial documents show what would become Jefferson as part of the "Tchoupitoulas Coast" of Native American settlement. In the French and Spanish colonial era it was divided into a series of plantations with boundary lines perpendicular to the Mississippi River.

In the American Civil War, Camp Parapet was built originally by Confederate forces to defend New Orleans from an attack from the upriver side. After the Union liberated the city sailing up from downriver, U.S. troops expanded the fortifications to defend from Confederate counterattacks which never came.

What is now Jefferson includes formerly separate small communities dating back to the 19th century, including, Hoeyville, New Carrollon, Southport, and  Shrewsbury,  along with 20th century subdivisions/land developments including Azalea Gardens, Camellia Gardens, Jefferson Heights, and Rio Vista. Some of these names continue to sometimes be used locally to refer to neighborhoods.

The current 4 lane Jefferson Highway was inaugurated in 1928, accelerating development as a suburban area within Greater New Orleans.

Former landmarks included what is best remembered as "The Beverly". An old plantation house was first converted to a "road house" music venue called "Suburban Gardens" in the 1920s; Louis Armstrong and his band had a summer residency here in 1931. In 1945 it was expanded into a lush (but illegal) gambling casino under the name the Beverly Country Club. After Federal crackdowns, it became a dinner theater until it burned down in 1983.

Geography
Jefferson is located in northern Jefferson Parish at  (29.964132, -90.157170). It is bordered to the north by Metairie, to the west by Elmwood, to the south, across the Mississippi River, by Bridge City, and to the east by the city of New Orleans in Orleans Parish. U.S. Route 90 (Jefferson Highway) runs through the center of the community, leading east  to downtown New Orleans.

The western part of Jefferson's Census area was lost to Elmwood during the 2000 census.

The northern boundary is separated from Metairie by the triple barriers of a drainage canal, railroad tracks, and the Earhart Expressway. The only open public road crossings are  Causeway Boulevard and Central Avenue. Many years ago, Labarre Road and Shrewsbury Road connected from River Road to Airline Dr. Many Residents in Old Jefferson prefer the route to continue to Airline Dr. Old Jefferson is now a tucked away neighborhood. It's largely expanding with new shops and businesses coming in. Landmarks include the Ochsner Medical Center complex.

Demographics

The 2019 American Community Survey estimated 10,501 people lived in the CDP, down from 11,193 at the 2010 United States census. At the 2020 census, there were 10,533 people in the CDP. In 2019, the racial and ethnic makeup was 62% non-Hispanic white, 23.5% Black or African American, 0.4% Native American, 1.1% Asian, 0.6% some other race, 1.7% two or more races, and 10.8% Hispanic and Latino American of any race. In 2020, its makeup was 59.07% non-Hispanic white, 21.79% Black or African American, 0.25% Native American, 1.39% Asian, 0.05% Pacific Islander, 3.83% two or more races, and 13.63% Hispanic and Latino American of any race. From earlier census reports and estimates, 2019 and 2020 have revealed the continuous diversification of the United States overall, representing a stark rise against the non-Hispanic white population. The median household income was $50,972 and 12.6% of the population lived at or below the poverty line according to 2019 census estimates.

Education

Primary and secondary schools
Jefferson Parish Public Schools operates schools in the parish and serves Jefferson.

Most residents are zoned to Jefferson Elementary School in Jefferson, while some are zoned to Dolhonde Elementary in Metairie. All students are zoned to Riverdale Middle School in Jefferson, and Riverdale High School in Jefferson. In regards to the advanced studies academies, students are zoned to Metairie Academy or Haynes Academy in Old Metairie.

St. Agnes School  a K-7 Catholic school of the Roman Catholic Archdiocese of New Orleans, was previously in Jefferson. It was founded in 1941, and closed in 2015. In 2014 it had 161 students, and then in 2015 it had 125 students. Principal Michael Buras stated that the school community gained an acceptance that the school will close. The school accepted school vouchers.  Jefferson Chamber Foundation Academy (JCFA) maintains a charter school for non-traditional students in the building.

Public libraries

Jefferson Parish Library operates the Rosedale Library in Jefferson. A Greek revival plantation house named "Rosedale," established in 1838, used to occupy the present day site of the library. In 1978 two fires destroyed the house, which was 140 years old. The library was established in 1986.

Healthcare

Ochsner Medical Center of the Ochsner Health System is in Jefferson CDP.

Notable people
Old Jefferson was home to jazz musicians Johnny Wiggs and William "Baba" Ridgely.

References

Census-designated places in Louisiana
Census-designated places in New Orleans metropolitan area
Census-designated places in Jefferson Parish, Louisiana
Louisiana populated places on the Mississippi River